Acacia eremophiloides is a shrub belonging to the genus Acacia and the subgenus Phyllodineae that is endemic to Queensland.

Description
The evergreen phyllodes are patent to erect and have a linear shape that can be shallowly incurved. It produces simple inflorescences occurring singly or in pairs in the axils. The spherical flower-heads contain 20 to 30 golden coloured flowers.

Taxonomy
The species was first formally  described by the botanists Leslie Pedley and P.I.Forst on 1986 as part of the work Acacia eremophiloides (Mimosaceae) A new species from south-eastern Queensland published in the journal Austrobaileya. It was reclassified by Pedley in 1987 as Racosperma eremophiloides then transferred back to genus Acacia in 2001.

Distribution
It is confined to a small area of South East Queensland in the Bunrett pastoral district.

See also
 List of Acacia species

References

eremophiloides
Flora of Queensland
Plants described in 1986
Taxa named by Leslie Pedley
Taxa named by Paul Irwin Forster